The Piney Creek Wilderness is an  wilderness area in Missouri. The United States Congress designated it wilderness in 1980. The Piney Creek Wilderness is located within the Ava-Cassville-Willow Springs Ranger District of the Mark Twain National Forest, east of Cassville, Missouri. The area is named after Piney Creek, which runs the length of the wilderness area and eventually empties into the James River arm of Table Rock Lake. The Piney Creek Wilderness is one of eight wilderness areas of the Mark Twain National Forest that are protected and preserved in Missouri.

The major east-west trail follows Piney Creek for approximately four miles. From Pineview Tower Trailhead on the north, two paths of 1.5 miles each lead south to Piney Creek. Two other maintained foot and horse trails leave the main trail to head south for a grand total of 13.1 Wilderness miles. Portions of the trail system include old roads.

See also 
 Bell Mountain Wilderness
 Devils Backbone Wilderness
 Hercules-Glades Wilderness
 Irish Wilderness
 Paddy Creek Wilderness
 Rockpile Mountain Wilderness

Notes

External links 
 Wildernesses of Mark Twain National Forest retrieved 17 Nov. 2008

Protected areas of Barry County, Missouri
IUCN Category Ib
Protected areas of Stone County, Missouri
Wilderness areas of Missouri
Mark Twain National Forest